Edward Leathes (10 February 1801 – 11 February 1871) was an English army officer and cricketer.

Leathes was born in Bury St Edmunds, Suffolk, the fifth son of George Leathes of the 1st Royal Dragoons, and his wife Mary Moore; Venn gives the year of birth as 1797. His brothers included John Francis Leathes of Herringfleet Hall, and the Rev. Frederick Leathes, Rector of Reedham. He was educated at Bury St Edmunds Grammar School, and matriculated at Christ's College, Cambridge in 1815, where he kept just three terms. He became a Lieutenant in the 1st Royal Dragoons, having joined as a cornet in 1816. His father died in 1817.

Leathes bought Normanston(e) Hall, south-west of Lowestoft, in 1832. He died 11 February 1871 at Normanston, and was buried at Herringfleet.

Leathes was a cricketer with amateur status who was associated with Suffolk and made his first-class debut in 1830.

Leathes married in 1823 Eliza Mary Galloway, daughter of John Galloway of Exeter. They had six sons and four daughters. The youngest son, Philip, of the Suffolk Regiment, later resided at Normanston Hall.

References

1801 births
1871 deaths
English cricketers
English cricketers of 1826 to 1863
Marylebone Cricket Club cricketers
Non-international England cricketers
Norfolk cricketers
Suffolk cricketers
Sportspeople from Bury St Edmunds
People from Lowestoft